Warren is the name of some places in the U.S. state of Wisconsin:
Warren, St. Croix County, Wisconsin
Warren, Waushara County, Wisconsin
Merton, Wisconsin, a town in Waukesha County was previously known as Warren